Dienestrol diacetate (brand names Faragynol, Gynocyrol, others) is a synthetic nonsteroidal estrogen of the stilbestrol group related to diethylstilbestrol. It is an ester of dienestrol.

See also 
 List of estrogen esters § Esters of other nonsteroidal estrogens
 List of sex-hormonal aqueous suspensions

References 

Abandoned drugs
Acetate esters
Estrogen esters
Phenols
Stilbenoids
Synthetic estrogens